Diego Reyes (born 1992) is a Mexican footballer.

Diego Reyes may also refer to:

 Diego Reyes (footballer, born 1979), Spanish football defender
 Diego Reyes (footballer, born 1990), Honduran footballer
 Diego Reyes (handballer) (born 1992), Chilean handball player